Nagaland Congress is a regional political party in the Indian state of Nagaland.

The party was founded in 2016 as a splinter group of the Indian National Congress.

Nagaland Congress is planning to rename the party as Nagaland Reformation Party.

In 2018 February, the party merged with National People's Party (NPP).

References

Political parties in Nagaland
Political parties established in 2016
2016 establishments in Nagaland